Bernt Karsten Øksendal (born 10 April 1945 in Fredrikstad) is a Norwegian mathematician. He completed his undergraduate studies at the University of Oslo, working under Otte Hustad. He obtained his PhD from University of California, Los Angeles in 1971; his thesis was titled Peak Sets and Interpolation Sets for Some Algebras of Analytic Functions and was supervised by Theodore Gamelin. In 1991, he was appointed as a professor at the University of Oslo. In 1992, he was appointed as an adjunct professor at the Norwegian School of Economics and Business Administration, Bergen, Norway.

His main field of interest is stochastic analysis, including stochastic control, optimal stopping, stochastic ordinary and partial differential equations and applications, particularly to physics, biology and finance. For his contributions to these fields, he was awarded the Nansen Prize in 1996. He has been a member of the Norwegian Academy of Science and Letters since 1996. He was elected as a member of the Norwegian Royal Society of Sciences in 2002.

As of February 2003, Øksendal has over 130 published works, including nine books. In 1982 he taught a postgraduate course in stochastic calculus at the University of Edinburgh which led to the book  In 2005, he taught a course in stochastic calculus at the African Institute for Mathematical Sciences in Cape Town.

He resided at Hosle. He married Eva Aursland in June 1968. They have three children: Elise (born 1971), Anders (1974) and Karina (1981).

Awards and Appointments 
 Visiting Research Fellow at the University of Edinburgh, Scotland. The fellowship was awarded by the Science and Engineering Research Council, UK (Jan.-June 1982).
 Norwegian Mathematical Society (Chairman 1987-1989)
 Appointed VISTA Professor by The Norwegian Academy of Sciences (1992-1996)
 Awarded Nansen Prize (1996)
 Elected member of Royal Norwegian Science Society (2002)
 European Research Council's Advanced Grant for Innovations in Stochastic Analysis and Applications (INNOSTOCH) (2009-2014)
 Awarded University of Oslo Research Prize for excellent research (2014)
 Scientific leader of the research program Challenges in Stochastic Control, Information and Applications (STOCONINF) (2016-2020)
 Appointed Honorary doctor at the Norwegian School of Economics

Selected publications

Articles
with Alexander Munro Davie: 

with A. M. Davie: 

with Helge Holden:

Books
 Øksendal, Bernt K. and Sydsæter, Knut (1996). Lineær Algebra. Universitetsforlaget.
 ; 
 Øksendal, Bernt K. and Sulem, Agnès (2005). Stochastic control of jump diffusions, Springer Verlag.

References

External links
 
 Bernt Øksendal's personal webpage

20th-century Norwegian mathematicians
21st-century Norwegian  mathematicians
Academic staff of the Norwegian School of Economics
Academic staff of the University of Oslo
University of Oslo alumni
University of California, Los Angeles alumni
1945 births
Living people
People from Fredrikstad
Control theorists
Probability theorists
Members of the Norwegian Academy of Science and Letters
Presidents of the Norwegian Mathematical Society